Founded in 1933, Mt. Ascutney Hospital and Health Center is a Vermont-based, not-for-profit hospital network dedicated to improving the lives of those we serve. The Hospital’s network includes the critical access-designated Mt. Ascutney Hospital and Historic Homes of Runnemede senior living community in Windsor, and Ottauquechee Health Center in Woodstock. Affiliated with Dartmouth Health, the Hospital provides people in communities across Southern Windsor County in Vermont and Sullivan County in New Hampshire with primary care and a comprehensive suite of specialty services, along with 25 inpatient beds, a therapeutic pool, and the 10 beds of the region’s most advanced inpatient rehabilitation center. The Hospital is accredited by the Commission on Accreditation of Rehabilitation Facilities (CARF), as well as the National Committee for Quality Assurance (NCQA) with Level 3 status, the highest level of medical home designation for delivering quality care.

References

External links

Hospital buildings completed in 1933
Hospitals in Vermont
Buildings and structures in Windsor, Vermont
1933 establishments in Vermont
Hospitals established in 1933